"Wet Dreamz" is a song by American rapper J. Cole, released on April 14, 2015 as the second single from his third studio album, 2014 Forest Hills Drive. The song samples "Mariya" by Family Circle and "Impeach the President" by The Honey Drippers, and was produced by J. Cole. As of 2021, the single has officially been certified platinum by the Recording Industry Association of America (RIAA).

Music video
On April 21, 2015, the accompanying video for "Wet Dreamz" was released on Cole's Vevo channel. It uses a pair of dogs to humorously represent the lyrics of the song, with the ending revealing they both belong to presumably J. Cole and the girl he wants to have sex with.

Charts

Certifications

References

2008 songs
2015 singles
J. Cole songs
Songs written by J. Cole
Song recordings produced by J. Cole
Columbia Records singles

American contemporary R&B songs